Symphony No. 25 may refer to:

Symphony No. 25 (Brian), composed by Havergal Brian
Symphony No. 25 (Haydn), composed by Joseph Haydn in 1763 or 1761
Symphony No. 25 (Michael Haydn), composed by Michael Haydn in 1783
Symphony No. 25 (Mozart), composed by Wolfgang Amadeus Mozart in 1773
Symphony No. 25 (Myaskovsky), composed by Nikolai Myaskovsky

025